Government Girls Degree College is public sector college located on Hayatabad, Peshawar Khyber Pakhtunkhwa, Pakistan. The college offers programs for intermediate both in Arts and Science groups affiliate with Board of Intermediate And Secondary Education Peshawar plus BA & BSc programs which are affiliated with Shaheed Benazir Bhutto Women University.

Overview & history 
Government Girls Degree College Hayatabad Peshawar is established in 2006 in phase 7 adjacent to new Haji Camp in Hayatabad, Peshawar. The college offers courses in Natural Sciences, Social Sciences and Humanities. The college is well connected through network of roads to different phases of Hayatabad and other adjacent areas. Currently the college is catering the needs of around 1000 students at intermediate and degree levels.

The college has started in July 2006 with 70 students in FA/FSc and BA/BSc with subjects such as Psychology, Sociology, Mathematics, Economics, Civics/Political Science, Law etc. The classes in English literature at intermediate level is started in 2011.

Faculties and departments 
The college currently has the following faculties and departments.

Faculty of Social Sciences 
 Department of Economics
 Department of English
 Department of Pak Studies
 Department of Geography
 Department of Health and physical Education
 Department of History
 Department of Home Economics
 Department of Islamyate
 Department of Law
 Department of Political Science
 Department of Psychology
 Department of Sociology
 Department of Urdu

Faculty of Physical Sciences 
 Department of Chemistry
 Department of Computer Science
 Department of Mathematics
 Department of Physics
 Department of Statestics

Faculty of Biological Sciences 
 Department of Botany
 Department of Zoology

See also  
 Edwardes College Peshawar
 Islamia College Peshawar
 Government Girls Degree College Mathra Peshawar

References

External links 
 Government Girls Degree College Hayatabad Peshawar Official Website

Colleges in Peshawar
Universities and colleges in Peshawar
Educational institutions established in 2006
2006 establishments in Pakistan